Ryan Coughlin (born April 4, 1973) is a former Canadian football offensive lineman who played three seasons with the Montreal Alouettes of the Canadian Football League (CFL). He was drafted 14th overall by the Alouettes in the second round of the 1997 CFL Draft. He played CIS football for the McGill Redmen of McGill University.

He was named an Academic All-Canadian his graduating year and was also selected with the 59th pick in the 4th round of the 1990 OHL draft by the Hamilton Dukes.

References

External links
Just Sports Stats

Living people
1973 births
Canadian football offensive linemen
McGill Redbirds football players
Montreal Alouettes players
Players of Canadian football from Ontario
People from Renfrew County